Damla Colbay (pronounced: dɒmlɑ d͡ʒɔlbɑ͡ɪ; born 14 January 1993) is a Turkish actress.

She became famous for her work on the TV series İçerde.

Life and career 
Damla Colbay was born in İzmir on 14 February 1990 to Erhan and Ayten Colbay. She spent her childhood years in Karşıyaka and moved to Istanbul in 2013. She studies acting at Dokuz Eylül University in İzmir.

Damla made her first television appearance in 2014 in the TV series named Kara Para Aşk as Demet Demir.

In 2015, Damla got her first leading role as İnci Temizyürek in the Turk remake of Juana la Virgen, titled Hayat Mucizelere Gebe. Due to low ratings the series ended in early 2016 with 7 episodes.

In 2016, she starred as Eylem Aydın in İçerde. The series received high ratings becoming one of the most successful series in 2016 and 2017 in Turkey.  İçerde broke the record as the most watched Turkish series on YouTube with its first episode reaching 11.6 million views as of July 2017.

Filmography

References

External links

1993 births
Living people
Turkish television actresses
21st-century Turkish actresses